Alfonso Savini (1836–1908) was an Italian painter, mainly of genre and flower paintings.

He was a resident in Bologna, and became professor of the Academy of Fine Arts of Bologna.  In 1884 at the Exhibition of Fine Arts in Turin, he exhibited: Luna di miele; Devota patrizia; Età dei fiori; and Laccio amoroso. In 1884 at Florence, he displayed: Spring flowers and Autumn flowers ; Oh come l'amo!...; and  Ritorna Primavera. In 1887 at Venice: Aspettando; Suor Maria; Dopo il pranzo; and Riflessioni. In 1888 at Bologna: Fate la pace and Altro tempi.

References

19th-century Italian painters
Italian male painters
20th-century Italian painters
Italian genre painters
Painters from Bologna
1836 births
1908 deaths
Academic staff of the Accademia di Belle Arti di Bologna
19th-century Italian male artists
20th-century Italian male artists